Boris Becker was the defending champion but did not compete that year.

Stefan Edberg won in the final 6–2, 6–2, 6–2 against Brad Gilbert.

Seeds
All sixteen seeds received a bye to the second round.

  Stefan Edberg (champion)
  Ivan Lendl (third round)
  Pete Sampras (semifinals)
  Andre Agassi (quarterfinals)
  David Wheaton (quarterfinals)
  Goran Ivanišević (semifinals)
  Derrick Rostagno (second round)
  Michael Chang (quarterfinals)
  Brad Gilbert (final)
  Andrei Chesnokov (second round)
  Richey Reneberg (third round)
  Aaron Krickstein (second round)
  Todd Woodbridge (third round)
  MaliVai Washington (third round)
  Wally Masur (second round)
  Wayne Ferreira (quarterfinals)

Draw

Finals

Top half

Section 1

Section 2

Bottom half

Section 3

Section 4

External links
 1991 Australian Indoor Championships draw

Singles